Rapido may refer to:

Transportation
 Rapido (train), former brand name for passenger rail services in Ontario and Quebec, Canada
 Arnold Rapido, a brand of model railway equipment manufactured by Arnold (models)
 Peugeot Rapido, a scooter built by Peugeot
 Optare Rapido, a discontinued coach manufactured by Optare
 Spanish cruiser Rapido, an 1889 auxiliary cruiser that served in the Spanish–American War
 Rapido (company), an Indian bike taxi driver company

Other uses
 Rapido (comics), a Marvel Comics character
 Rapido (river), a river in Italy
 Rapido (TV series), a music TV programme presented by Antoine de Caunes
 Ratz (TV series), originally titled Rapido, a joint French and Canadian animated series, also the name of one of the two main characters
 Rápido de Bouzas, a Spanish football team
 Peugeot Rapido, a scooter built by Peugeot
 Rapido Trimarans, a brand of multihull ship
 A South Korean fashion and sports wear brand by Samsung C&T Corporation